Laurence Vallières (born 1986) is a Canadian sculptor and artist. Vallières is best known for her sculptures made from upcycled materials. In 2016 she was commissioned by the Burning Man Festival to create two large cardboard ape sculptures, titled Seeing humanity for what it really is. Her work is  included in the Coleccion Solo in Madrid, Spain.

References

External links

1986 births
Artists from Quebec City
Canadian women sculptors
Living people
Sculptors from Quebec
21st-century Canadian sculptors
21st-century Canadian women artists
Concordia University alumni